Phoebe Kathryne Strole (born January 22, 1983 in Fort Worth, Texas) is an American actress who is best known for originating the role of Anna in the 2006 Broadway musical Spring Awakening.

Early life

Strole graduated from Southwest High School in Fort Worth, Texas. While in high school, Strole performed in several productions at Casa Mañana Theatre in Fort Worth, Texas, including Evita, Violet and Bye Bye Birdie. In 2001, Strole starred as Jean in A Different Moon at the Penguin Repertory Theatre in Stony Point, New York. Additional Penguin Rep credits include Animal of the Year.

She graduated from NYU's Tisch School of the Arts in 2006 with a Bachelor of Fine Arts in Drama. Tisch credits include a reading of When Grace Comes In opposite Marcia Gay Harden.

Stage career

Strole is perhaps best known for her role in the Broadway musical Spring Awakening in which she played the role of Anna and understudied the roles of Wendla and Ilse. She played the role from the musical's Broadway debut on December 10, 2006 through July 19, 2008. She also played the same role in the original Off Broadway production earlier during the summer of 2006. Phoebe shared her final performance in Spring Awakening on July 19, 2008 with fellow costars Skylar Astin, Remy Zaken, Brian Charles Johnson and Lilli Cooper. She was the eldest OBC playing a principal role, having been 23 when cast.

Strole was a cast member in The New Group production of Eugene O'Neill's play Mourning Becomes Electra at the Alcorn Theatre in New York, which ran from January 27 to April 18, 2009.

Strole performed in Parade at the Center Theatre Group in Los Angeles from September 24 to November 19, 2009.

Strole played the role of Vera Dundee in The Metal Children, written and directed by Adam Rapp, from May 5 to June 13, 2010 at the Vineyard Theatre. From March through April 2012, she appeared in Dan LeFranc's The Big Meal at Playwrights Horizons.

She was seen alongside Edie Falco in the Manhattan Theatre Club production of The Madrid, which began previews on February 5, 2013, and opened on February 26, 2013. The show ran until May 5, 2013, after it had been extended.

Strole appeared in the Signature Theatre Company production of Kung Fu by David Henry Hwang. The play ran from February 4 through April 6, 2014 at the Pershing Square Signature Center. In October 2014, Strole played Lena in The Other Room, a solo show performed as part of Premieres' Inner Voices series.

In 2022, she took part in the HBO documentary film Spring Awakening: Those You've Known, which saw the 15 year reunion of the original cast of the musical.

Film and television

Strole starred in The Time Travelers Convention, an original musical podcast about her trying to travel back in time into the dinosaur age. The musical premiered on YouTube on January 11, 2011.<ref>"Nick Blaemire & Phoebe Stole to Appear in THE TIME TRAVELERS CONVENTION" broadwayworld.com', January 11, 2011. Retrieved April 10, 2011.</ref>

In 2006, she narrated the part of Clare, alongside Fred Berman, who narrated the part of Henry, in an audiobook version of The Time Traveler's Wife by Audrey Niffenegger which was published by Audible and HighBridge and runs a length of approximately 17 hours and 38 minutes.

Television credits include a recurring role as Jennifer on the FX Network's show Rescue Me.  She has also had guest lead appearances on Law & Order: Criminal Intent, 30 Rock, Mercy and Stella.

Strole starred as Sara in the 2009 film Sorority Wars. Strole starred as Epiphany Sellars in the 2008 film Hamlet 2 alongside Steve Coogan and her Spring Awakening co-star Skylar Astin. She sang "Raped in the Face" and "Rock Me Sexy Jesus" on the soundtrack with Astin and Coogan. Additional movie credits include Descent and My One and Only.

Strole's friend, Lea Michele, announced on Twitter on August 22, 2013, that Strole was set to appear on Glee during its fifth season. Her character, Penny Owen, was a sophomore in college and Sam Evans' new love interest. She appeared in two episodes.

Grammy awards
 Nomination/Win 2008: Best Musical Show Album Spring Awakening'' (Musical)

Filmography

Stage

Film

Television

Video games

References

External links
 
 Phoebe Strole on Myspace

Actresses from Texas
21st-century American actresses
American film actresses
American television actresses
American video game actresses
1983 births
Living people
People from Fort Worth, Texas
Tisch School of the Arts alumni
American stage actresses